The gray short-tailed bat, or Hahn's short-tailed bat (Carollia subrufa), is a species of bat in the family Phyllostomidae native to Mexico and Central America.

Description
The species is sexually dimorphic, with females being significantly larger than males. It has grey to grey-brown fur over its upper body, with pale grey underparts and grey-brown wing and tail membranes. It has triangular ears, a short muzzle, and a pointed triangular nose leaf. As the common name implies, the tail is short, and it does not extend to the edge of the uropatagium.

Distribution and habitat
Less certain are reports from as far north as Jalisco, and as far south as Panama. It has no recognised subspecies, and the bat was until recently thought to be a subspecies of the chestnut short-tailed bat.

Biology and behaviour
The gray short-tailed bat is omnivorous, feeding on insects, fruit, and nectar. Its preferred fruits include breadnut, Cecropia peltata, figs, Jamaican cherry, and pepper. They are gregarious animals, living in communal roosts in caves, empty trees or other available shelter, often sharing its roosts with other species of bat, such as Pallas's long-tongued bat and the long-legged bat. The species breeds throughout the year.

References

Carollia
Mammals described in 1905
Taxonomy articles created by Polbot